Ocean class may refer to:

Ocean ship, a class of cargo ships used by the British Ministry of War Transport in WWII
Océan-class ironclad, used by the French Navy
Océan-class ship of the line, used by the French Navy
Ocean class, a type of survey vessel used by the Russian Hydrographic Service